In mathematics, more specifically in dynamical systems, the method of averaging (also called averaging theory) exploits systems containing time-scales separation: a fast oscillation versus a slow drift. It suggests that we perform an averaging over a given amount of time in order to iron out the fast oscillations and observe the qualitative behavior from the resulting dynamics. The approximated solution holds under finite time inversely proportional to the parameter denoting the slow time scale. It turns out to be a customary problem where there exists the trade off between how good is the approximated solution balanced by how much time it holds to be close to the original solution.

More precisely, the system has the following form
The averaging method yields an autonomous dynamical system

In this way, qualitative methods for autonomous dynamical systems may be employed to analyze the equilibria and more complex structures, such as slow manifold and invariant manifolds, as well as their stability in the phase space of the averaged system.

The averaging method has a long history, which is deeply rooted in perturbation problems that arose in celestial mechanics (see, for example in ).

First example 

Consider a perturbed logistic growth

and the averaged equation
The purpose of the method of averaging is to tell us the qualitative behavior of the vector field when we average it over a period of time. It guarantees that the solution  approximates  for times  Exceptionally: in this example the approximation is even better, it is valid for all times. We present it in a section below.

Definitions 
We expand this time-dependent vector field in a Taylor series (in powers of ) with remainder . We introduce the following notation:

As we are concerned with averaging problems, in general  is zero, so it turns out that we will be interested in vector fields given by

Besides, we define the following initial value problem to be in the standard form:

Theorem: averaging in the periodic case 
Consider for every  connected and bounded  and every  there exist  and  such that the original system (a non-autonomous dynamical system) given by

has solution , where  is periodic with period  and  both with  bounded on bounded sets. Then there exists a constant  such that the solution  of the averaged system  (autonomous dynamical system) is

is

Remarks 

 There are two approximations in this what is called first approximation estimate: reduction to the average of the vector field and negligence of  terms. 
The proof and discussion of this can be found in J. Murdock's book.
 Reduction of regularity: there is a more general form of this theorem which requires only  to be Lipschitz and  continuous. It is a more recent proof and can be seen in Sanders et al.. The theorem statement presented here is due to the proof framework proposed by Krylov-Bogoliubov which is based on an introduction of a near-identity transformation. The advantage of this method is the extension to more general settings such as infinite-dimensional systems - partial differential equation or delay differential equations.
J. Hale presents generalizations to almost periodic vector-fields.

Strategy of the proof 
Krylov-Bogoliubov realized that the slow dynamics of the system determines the leading order of the asymptotic solution.

In order to proof it, they proposed a near-identity transformation, which turned out to be a change of coordinates with its own time-scale transforming the original system to the averaged one.

Sketch of the proof 

 Determination of a near-identity transformation: the smooth mapping where  is assumed to be regular enough and  periodic.
 Choose an appropriate solving the homological equation of the averaging theory: . 
Change of coordinates carries the original system to 
 Estimation of error due to truncation and comparison to the original variable.

Non-autonomous class of systems: more examples 
Along the history of the averaging technique, there is class of system extensively studied which give us meaningful examples we will discuss below. The class of system is given by:

where  is smooth. This system is similar to a linear system with a small nonlinear perturbation given by 
:

differing from the standard form. Hence there is a necessity to perform a transformation to make it in the standard form explicitly. We are able to change coordinates using variation of constants method. We look at the unperturbed system, i.e. , given by

which has the fundamental solution corresponding to a rotation. Then the time-dependent change of coordinates is  where  is the coordinates respective to the standard form.

If we take the time derivative in both sides and invert the fundamental matrix we obtain

Remarks 

 The same can be done to time-dependent linear parts. Although the fundamental solution may be non-trivial to write down explicitly, the procedure is similar. See Sanders et al.  for further details.
For this occasion, the perturbation equation may present some serious problems even whether  is bounded, since the solution grows exponentially fast. However, qualitatively, we may be able to know the asymptotic solution, such as Hartman-Grobman results and more.
If we average it as long as a neighborhood of the origin is excluded (since the polar coordinates fail) yields:

where the averaged system is

Example: Misleading averaging results 

The method contains some assumptions and restrictions. These limitations play important role when we average the original equation which is not into the standard form, and we can discuss counterexample of it. The following example in order to discourage this hurried averaging:
where we put following the previous notation.

Averaging the friction term over one cycle of  yields the equation:
The solution is

The averaged system obtained from the standard form yields:

which in the rectangular coordinate shows explicitly that indeed the rate of convergence to the origin is  differing from the previous crude averaged system:

Example: Van der Pol Equation 

Van der Pol was concerned with obtaining approximate solution for equations of the type

where  following the previous notation. This system is named Van der Pol oscillator. If we apply periodic averaging to this nonlinear oscillator, this give us qualitative knowledge of the phase space without solving explicitly the system.

The averaged system is

and we can analyze the fixed points and their stability.

The existence of such stable limit-cycle can be stated as a theorem.

Theorem (Existence of a periodic orbit): If is a hyperbolic fixed point of 
Then there exists such that for all ,

The proof can be found at Guckenheimer and Holmes, Sanders et al.  and for the angle case in Chicone.

Example: Restricting the time interval 

The average theorem assumes existence of a connected and bounded region which affects the time interval  of the result validity. The following example points it out. Consider the

where .  The averaged system consists of

which under this initial condition indicates that the original solution behaves like

Damped Pendulum 
Consider a damped pendulum whose point of suspension is vibrated vertically by a small amplitude, high frequency signal (this is usually known as dithering). The equation of motion for such a pendulum is given by

The phase space form of this equation is given by

where we have introduced the variable  and written the system as an autonomous, first-order system in -space.

Suppose that the angular frequency of the vertical vibrations, is much greater than the natural frequency of the pendulum, . Suppose also that the amplitude of the vertical vibrations, is much less than the length  of the pendulum. The pendulum's trajectory in phase space will trace out a spiral around a curve , moving along  at the slow rate  but moving around it at the fast rate .

Extension error estimates 
Average technique for initial value problems has been treated up to now with an validity error estimates of order . However, there are circumstances where the estimates can be extended for further times, even the case for all times. Below we deal with a system containing an asymptotically stable fixed point. Such situation recapitulates what is illustrated in Figure 1.

Theorem (Eckhaus /Sanchez-Palencia ) Consider the initial value problem

Suppose

exists and contains an asymptotically stable fixed point  in the linear approximation. For any compact   and for all 

References 

Dynamical systems